Nilgunj Road connects  Belgharia to Sodepur via Agarpara in North 24 Parganas. It runs parallel to B.T. Road. Narula Institute of Technology, Agarpara and Guru Nanak Institute of Technology, Sodepur are located on the road.

References

Roads in Kolkata